Nolana (Chilean bell flower) is a genus of hard annual or perennial plants in the nightshade family. The genus is mostly native to Chile and Peru. Species in this genus, especially N. paradoxa, serve as a model system for studies on flower color.

Classification
There are a number of synonyms for Nolana: Alibrexia, Aplocarya, Bargemontia, Dolia, Gubleria, Leloutrea, Neudorfia, Osteocarpus, Pachysolen, Periloba, Rayera, Sorema, Teganium, Tula, Velpeaulia, Walberia, and Zwingera.

Nolana is the only genus in the Solanaceae which has a fruit composed of mericarps, although its flower and other vegetative morphology is similar to other plants in this family.  It seems to be most closely related to Lycium and Grabowskia.

There are about 85 to 89 species.

Selected species
Nolana acuminata
Nolana atriplicifolia
Nolana crassulifolia 
Nolana galapagensis
Nolana humifusa
Nolana prostrata
Nolana rupicola
Nolana sedifolia
Nolana tenella
Nolana paradoxa

References

Solanoideae
Solanaceae genera
Flora of Chile
Flora of Peru